Cristian Alexandru Stoica, also known as Alessandro Stoica (born 1 August 1976, in Bucharest) is a Romanian-Italian retired rugby union footballer, who played as a centre.

Career
Stoica played for the youth Steaua Bucharest team in his first years, from 1984/85 to 1988/89. He moved to Italy in 1989 with his family. He later became a naturalized Italian citizen. He played for CUS Pavia (1995/96), Amatori Rugby Milano (1996/97), in the National Championship of Excellence. He moved to France, where he would play for RC Narbonne (1997/01). He spent a season at Gloucester Rugby (2001/02), returning afterwards to France, where he played for Castres Olympique (2002/03), Montpellier Hérault (2003/08), where he won the European Shield in 2004, and SC Mazamet (2009/10), where he finished his career.

He had 71 caps for Italy, from 1997 to 2007, scoring 11 tries, 55 points on aggregate. He was called for the 1999 Rugby World Cup, playing in three games but without scoring. He was called once again for the 2003 Rugby World Cup, playing in three games.

He played in the Six Nations Championship from 2000 to 2006; he had 28 caps, with a try scored.

Honours

Club
Narbonne
European Challenge Cup runner-up: 2000–01

Castres Olympique
European Shield: 2002–03

Montpellier Hérault 
European Shield: 2003–04

References

External links

1976 births
Living people
Rugby union players from Bucharest
Romanian emigrants to Italy
Italian rugby union players
Naturalised citizens of Italy
Rugby union centres
Amatori Rugby Milano players
RC Narbonne players
Gloucester Rugby players
Castres Olympique players
Montpellier Hérault Rugby players
Italian people of Romanian descent
Italy international rugby union players
Italian expatriate rugby union players
Expatriate rugby union players in France
Expatriate rugby union players in England
Italian expatriate sportspeople in France
Italian expatriate sportspeople in England
CSA Steaua București (rugby union) players
Romanian rugby union players